The individual eventing in equestrian at the 2012 Olympic Games in London was held at Greenwich Park from 28 to 31 July. Michael Jung of Germany won the gold medal. Sweden's Sara Algotsson Ostholt won silver and Sandra Auffarth, also of Germany, took bronze.

Competition format

The team and individual eventing competitions used the same scores. Eventing consisted of a dressage test, a cross-country test, and a jumping test. The jumping test had two rounds. After the first jumping round, the teams results were determined. Both jumping rounds counted towards the individual results. Only the top 25 horse and rider pairs (including ties for 25th) after the first jumping round (adding the three components) competed in the second jumping round. However, each nation was limited to a maximum of three pairs qualifying for the second (final) jumping round. The format used in London, was the same  as the one used in both Athens and Beijing.

The cross-country course was 5,728 meters long, with 28 obstacles and 40 efforts. The allowed time was set at 10:03 for an average speed of 570m/min. The jumping course was 515m with an allowed time of 1:23.

Schedule

All times are British Summer Time (UTC+1)

Results

Standings after Dressage

Standings after Cross-country

Standings after Jumping (Round 1)

Top 25 qualify for the final with a maximum of 3 riders per Nation (NOC).

Final Results after Jumping (Round 2)

Note:The four pairs who did not advance to the final jumping round because three pairs from their nation had already qualified, were Dirk Schrade, William Fox-Pitt, Nicola Wilson and Caroline Powell.

References

Individual eventing